Indrajit Chougale (born 27 July 1994) is an Indian professional footballer who plays as a midfielder for DSK Shivajians in the I-League.

Career
Born in Sangli, Chougale started his career with Pune-based Deccan Rovers before moving to DSK Shivajians of the I-League. He made his professional debut for DSK Shivajians in their first ever I-League match against Sporting Goa on 17 January 2016. He played 96 minutes before being substituted off as DSK Shivajians drew the match 0–0.He has also played for Dilbahar Talim Mandal, a football club in Kolhapur.

I-League statistics

References

External links 
 DSK Shivajians Profile.

1994 births
Living people
People from Sangli
Indian footballers
DSK Shivajians FC players
Association football midfielders
Footballers from Maharashtra
I-League players